Easytrieve is a report generator, sold by CA Technologies. Easytrieve Classic and Easytrieve Plus are two available versions of this programming languages primarily designed to generate reports and are used by large corporations operating in mainframe (z/OS, z/VM, z/VSE), UNIX, Linux, and Microsoft Windows environments.

Easytrieve was originally developed by Ribek Corporation (named for its owner Robert I. Beckler), with an initial release around 1971 or 1972. Easytrieve was originally developed for IBM Systems 360/370 and RCA Series 70 mainframes. Pansophic became the exclusive reseller of Easytrieve in North America in 1973, and then purchased it from Ribek in 1979. Pansophic was bought by Computer Associates in 1991, who in turn were acquired by Broadcom in 2018.

Easytrieve has been described as "[o]ne of the most successful software products of the 1970s".

Example 
FILE PERSNL FB(150 1800)           } LIBRARY DEFINITION
    NAME  17 8 A 
    PERSNR 9 5 N
    ABTL  98 3 N
    SUMME 94 4 P 2
JOB INPUT PERSNL NAME SUM-PERS     } ACTIVITY DEFINITION
  PRINT PAYRPT
  REPORT PAYRPT LINESIZE 80
  TITLE 01 'PERSONALREPORT BEISPIEL1'
  LINE 01 ABTL NAME PERSNR SUMME

References

External Links
 CA Easytrieve® Report Generator
 Advantage CA-Easytrieve Plus Report Generator (Application Guide)
 Easytrieve code examples and snippets
 PC-Dos version of Pansophic's Easytrieve Plus Workstation and Natural Language

Object-oriented programming languages
Fourth-generation programming languages
CA Technologies